Autumn Rademacher (born September 7, 1975) is an American college basketball coach who is currently a women's basketball assistant coach at Arkansas State. Previously, Rademacher was head coach at the University of Detroit Mercy from 2008 to 2015. She came to the Titans after serving as an assistant coach at Green Bay for four seasons and Western Michigan for seven seasons. In her second season, she led the Titans to a second-place finish in the Horizon League, its best finish since the 1998–99 season. In her fourth year she led the Titans to the Women's Basketball Invitational (WBI) Championship with a win over the McNeese State Cowgirls, 73–62. She was hired as an assistant coach for the Arkansas State Red Wolves on June 8, 2015.

Player history and education
Born in Traverse City, Michigan, Rademacher played NCAA Division I women's basketball on the collegiate level at Detroit. She earned conference first team honors in 1996 and 1997, after earning a position on the second-team and All-Newcomer team as a freshman in 1994. She currently ranks in the top-10 in multiple statistical categories after four seasons as a starter at UDM, including third in career assists (439) and second in career 3-point field goals (201). Rademacher helped lead the Titans to a Horizon League tournament championship and a berth in the 1997 NCAA tournament as a senior season.  Rademacher graduated from UDM in 1997 with a degree in criminal justice.

Detroit statistics

Source

Head coaching record

References

1975 births
Living people
American women's basketball coaches
American women's basketball players
Arkansas State Red Wolves women's basketball coaches
Basketball coaches from Michigan
Basketball players from Michigan
Detroit Mercy Titans women's basketball coaches
Detroit Mercy Titans women's basketball players
Green Bay Phoenix women's basketball coaches
High school basketball coaches in the United States
Sportspeople from Traverse City, Michigan
Western Michigan Broncos women's basketball coaches
Youngstown State Penguins women's basketball coaches